Felipe Carvalho Nogueira (born 10 June 1983) is a former Brazilian footballer.

Career
After graduating from Santos youth football system, Felipe played professional football as a defender. He played in the Campeonato Mineiro with Uberaba Sport Club, Araxá Esporte Clube, Nacional Futebol Clube (MG) and Guarani Esporte Clube (MG). He also had spells with Francana and Atlanta Silverbacks.

After he retired from playing in February 2014, Felipe trained to become a football manager, initially working as an assistant manager at former clubs Nacional and Uberaba. By 2018, Felipe had started his own business and declined an opportunity to rejoin Uberaba as assistant manager.

College
Nogueira played college soccer for Lincoln Memorial University. His strength combined with his athleticism and skills make him an excellent defender. In his freshman year of college Felipe Nogueira already established himself as one of the top defenders in the nation. Nogueira became the defender with the most goals scored all time of the Lincoln Memorial University soccer program. After 3 seasons played at the NCAA, Felipe Nogueira won the following individual awards, including:

As a Freshman:

 NCAA Appalachian Region All-Tournament
 NCAA First Team All-Region
 LMU Defensive Player of the year

As a Sophomore:

 Pre-season SAC All-Conference
 First Team SAC All Conference
 NCAA Appalachian Region All-Tournament
 First Team NCAA All-Region
 First Team Daktronics All-American
 SAC Player of the week (October 9, 2007)

As a Junior:

 Pre Season SAC All-Conference
 First Team SAC All-Conference
 SAC All-Tournament Team
 First Team Daktronics All-Region 
 First Team NSCAA All-Region
 All-American Honorable Mention
 LMU Athlete of the year
 LMU defensive player of the year

Career statistics

Club

Notes

Personal
Felipe is the son of former Uberaba Sport Club director, Ernani Nogueira.

References

1983 births
Living people
Brazilian footballers
Brazilian expatriate footballers
Association football defenders
Association football midfielders
USL League Two players
Santos FC players
Associação Atlética Francana players
Uberaba Sport Club players
Atlanta Silverbacks U23's players
Baton Rouge Capitals players
Araxá Esporte Clube players
Guarani Esporte Clube (MG) players
Brazilian expatriate sportspeople in the United States
Expatriate soccer players in the United States